Ralph "Bus" Wycherley (February 26, 1920 — March 4, 2007) was a Canadian ice hockey player who played 28 games in the National Hockey League for the New York Americans/Brooklyn Americans between 1940 and 1942. The rest of his career, which lasted from 1940 to 1950, was spent in various minor leagues. Wycherley was born in Saskatoon, Saskatchewan and played junior hockey for the Brandon Elks.

Career statistics

Regular season and playoffs

External links
 

1920 births
2007 deaths
Brandon Elks players
Brooklyn Americans players
Canadian ice hockey left wingers
Cleveland Barons (1937–1973) players
Hershey Bears players
Ice hockey people from Saskatchewan
New York Americans players
Ontario Hockey Association Senior A League (1890–1979) players
Philadelphia Ramblers players
Sportspeople from Saskatoon
Springfield Indians players
Canadian expatriates in the United States